Belyachy is a rural locality (a settlement) in Seitovsky Selsoviet, Krasnoyarsky District, Astrakhan Oblast, Russia. The population was 378 as of 2010. There are 11 streets.

Geography 
Belyachy is located 38 km northwest of Krasny Yar (the district's administrative centre) by road. Buzan-Pristan is the nearest rural locality.

References 

Rural localities in Krasnoyarsky District, Astrakhan Oblast